Entrialgo (Entralgo in Spanish) is one of the nine parishes in Laviana, a municipality within the province and autonomous community of Asturias, in northern Spain. The population as of 2011 is 250 people and it has a surface of 6,87 km2.

Location
Between the AS-17 and AS-52 roads, Entrialgo is located two kilometers from Pola de Laviana, the capital of the municipality.

Villages and hamlets
Canzana
Entrialgo (known as the place of birth of writer Armando Palacio Valdés)
El Meruxalín
La Peruyal
La Boza
Mardana
Los Cuarteles

Other small entities:
La Casa'l Regueru
La Chalana (widely known for its bridge and the Descenso Folclórico del Nalón)
La Curuxera
Les Llanes
La Segá
Tambarriegues

Notable people
Armando Palacio Valdés, writer

References

External links
 Entrialgo at Laviana Town Hall website

Parishes in Laviana